The Rocky Mountain National Park Utility Area Historic District in Rocky Mountain National Park documents the early administrative core of the park. Beginning in 1920 and continuing into the 1930s, park service and administrative structures were built in the National Park Service Rustic style.  Most buildings were built of logs under a policy of blending with the natural landscape.  Later construction has respected the materials and scale of the area. Structures include McLaren Hall, designed by landscape architect W.G. Hill, a number of employee residences including the superintendent's residence, equipment sheds, garages and utility buildings. Many of the buildings built in the 1930s were built by Civilian Conservation Corps labor. The Beaver Meadows Visitor Center is individually listed as a National Historic Landmark.

See also
National Register of Historic Places listings in Larimer County, Colorado

References

Park buildings and structures on the National Register of Historic Places in Colorado
National Park Service rustic in Colorado
Buildings and structures in Larimer County, Colorado
National Register of Historic Places in Rocky Mountain National Park
Historic districts on the National Register of Historic Places in Colorado
Civilian Conservation Corps in Colorado
National Register of Historic Places in Larimer County, Colorado
1982 establishments in Colorado